Athelia arachnoidea is a corticioid fungus in the family Atheliaceae. The species forms thin, white, cobwebby basidiocarps (fruit bodies) and typically occurs saprotrophically on leaf litter and fallen wood. It can, however, also be a facultative parasite of lichens and can additionally be a plant pathogen (typically found in its asexual Fibularhizoctonia carotae state), causing "crater rot" of stored carrots.

References

Fungal plant pathogens and diseases
Eudicot diseases
Atheliales
Fungi described in 1844
Taxa named by Miles Joseph Berkeley
Lichenicolous fungi